Saint Seiya is a Japanese manga written and drawn by Masami Kurumada. The plot follows a teenager named Seiya who becomes one of the 88 soldiers for the goddess Athena, named Saints. The Saints have the ability to use energy from the universe, and use it to fight against any person who attacks Athena.

The individual chapters were published by Shueisha in the magazine Weekly Shōnen Jump from January 1, 1986 to November 19, 1990. They were also and compiled into 28 tankōbon volumes. The first volume was released in September 1986, and volume 28 was released in April 1991. In addition to the original volumes, the series has been reissued four times. The first reissue was in 1995 with the Aizōban the "Collector's Version". The second reissue was as 15 bunkoban volumes in 2001 called the "Library Version". The first eighteen volumes of the manga series were adapted into a 114-episode anime series by Toei Animation, while a series of OVAs adapted the following volumes in 31 episodes.

The series was re-released in 2003 in 19 volumes with Setteis from the anime adaptation called the "Remix Version". The fourth reissue, in 22 volumes, called the "Complete Version" which contains additional colored pages as well as colored armor schematics. In addition, the "Remix Version" was republished at the end of 2007 to coincide with the broadcast of Chapter Elysion of the anime. Viz Media has licensed the manga for release in North America under their Shonen Jump imprint. Shonen Jump has changed the covers and added  Knights of the Zodiac to the volumes to make Saint Seiya: Knights of the Zodiac. The first volume of the series was released on January 21, 2004, and as of February 2, 2010 all twenty-eight volumes have been released.



Volume list

Sequel
Saint Seiya: Next Dimension

References

External links
Official Viz Media website of the Saint Seiya manga
Saint Seiya official website 

Chapters (Saint Seiya)